Ralph Tubbs OBE FRIBA (9 January 1912 – 23 November 1996) was a British architect. Well known amongst the buildings he designed was the Dome of Discovery at the successful Festival of Britain on the South Bank in London in 1951.

Ralph was educated at the Architectural Association, which is highly regarded in Modern architecture and engineering, and then worked for Ernő Goldfinger from 1935 onward, participating in the design of Goldfinger's house on 2 Willow Road. In 1940 he designed the Living in Cities exhibition for the British Institute of Adult Education and the Council for Encouragement of Music and Arts, for which he made in 1942 a small book as well. During the World War II, Tubbs was not in services for medical reason, and worked as firewatcher.

Buildings designed by Tubbs include (dates shown for design to building)
 1935–1938 only working drawings for 2 Willow Road, Hampstead, London (designed by Erno Goldfinger)
 1948–1951 Dome of Discovery, South Bank, London
 1952–1953 YMCA Indian Student Hostel, Fitzrovia, London
 1956–1961 Baden-Powell House, Kensington, London
 1960 Granada House, Manchester
1959-1973 Charing Cross Hospital, Hammersmith, London (constructed 1969–73)

Ralph and his wife Mary Tubbs lived in Wimbledon Village for most of their life. They had two sons and a daughter: Jonathan Tubbs, who is currently an architect in Wimbledon, James Tubbs, who is an engineer and Danielle who is a nurse. Ralph won many awards for his designs. His wife died in May 2007.

Ralph Tubbs's Dome of Discovery project was given tribute at the Millennium Dome. In 1951, The Dome of Discovery was not only the largest diameter dome in the world, 365 feet across, but was totally unsupported except around the perimeter.

Publications

References

1912 births
1996 deaths
20th-century English architects
Alumni of the Architectural Association School of Architecture
Fellows of the Royal Institute of British Architects